Jason Ashby (born 16 May 1994) is a professional Australian rules footballer with the Essendon Football Club in the Australian Football League (AFL).

Ashby attended Carey Baptist Grammar School, and played for the Oakleigh Chargers in the TAC Cup. He was recruited by Essendon with the 34th overall selection in the 2012 national draft and made his debut against  in round 3, 2014. At the conclusion of the 2016 season, he was delisted.

Statistics

|- style="background-color: #EAEAEA"
! scope="row" style="text-align:center" | 2014
|
| 14 || 5 || 0 || 0 || 30 || 33 || 63 || 12 || 9 || 0.0 || 0.0 || 6.0 || 6.6 || 12.6 || 2.4 || 1.8
|-
! scope="row" style="text-align:center" | 2015
|
| 14 || 5 || 0 || 0 || 17 || 19 || 36 || 9 || 15 || 0.0 || 0.0 || 3.4 || 3.8 || 7.2 || 1.8 || 3.0
|- style="background-color: #EAEAEA"
! scope="row" style="text-align:center" | 2016
|
| 14 || 2 || 0 || 0 || 12 || 11 || 23 || 2 || 8 || 0.0 || 0.0 || 6.0 || 5.5 || 11.5 || 1.0 || 4.0
|- class="sortbottom"
! colspan=3| Career
! 12
! 0
! 0
! 59
! 63
! 122
! 23
! 32
! 0.0
! 0.0
! 4.9
! 5.3
! 10.2
! 1.9
! 2.7
|}

References

External links

1994 births
Living people
Essendon Football Club players
Australian rules footballers from Victoria (Australia)
Oakleigh Chargers players
People educated at Carey Baptist Grammar School